The Ontario Colleen Stakes  is a Canadian Thoroughbred horse race run annually at Woodbine Racetrack in Toronto, Ontario. Open to three-year-old fillies, it is raced on turf over a distance of one mile (8 furlongs). Prior to 2016, it was run in late August but now is run in late September.

Inaugurated in 1979 at the Fort Erie Racetrack, the following year it was moved to the Woodbine Racetrack. It remained there through 1993 and then returned to Fort Erie for the 1994 running. Since 1995 it has been at the Woodbine facility.

The race was run in two divisions from 1979-1989, 1993, 1995-1996.

It became a Grade III race in 2011.

Records
Speed  record: 
 1:33.32 - Leigh Court (2013)

Winners since 1998

See also
 List of Canadian flat horse races

References

 The 2008 Ontario Colleen Stakes at Woodbine Entertainment

Graded stakes races in Canada
Flat horse races for three-year-old fillies
Recurring sporting events established in 1979
Woodbine Racetrack
1979 establishments in Ontario